30 South Colonnade is a commercial building in Canary Wharf, London. It occupies the FC-6 plot from the original Canary Wharf plans. Kohn Pedersen Fox were appointed as architect and the building was completed in 1991. As of December 2020 it is being rebuilt and remodelled with three additional floors, with completion expected in 2022.

Owners
Canary Wharf Group sold the building for £200m to German fund manager KanAm Grund in December 2005. In May 2015, KanAm instructed CBRE and JLL to prepare the building for sale, with an asking price of £215m.

Tenants
Reuters agreed to lease the majority of the building in 2005, their lease ran to May 2020. The building served as Thomson Reuters Corporation's European headquarters. As part of Reuters' relocation, Perkins + Will carried out extensive refurbishment of the building, including installing a 100 metre long ticker around the building to display news and stock prices. Five retail tenants made up the remainder of the building's tenants.

Prior to this, the building was occupied by London Underground.

References

Office buildings in London
Buildings and structures in the London Borough of Tower Hamlets
Canary Wharf buildings
Kohn Pedersen Fox buildings
Office buildings completed in 1991